God's Country is a 1946 comedy Western film directed by Robert Emmett Tansey and starring Robert Lowery, Helen Gilbert and Buster Keaton.  It is a low-budget color B Western set in the contemporary American West.

Plot
Lee Preston, aka Leland Bruce (Lowery), kills a man in self-defense but flees to the redwood country when the law makes it a murder charge. There he meets Lynn O'Malley (Gilbert), the niece of "Sandy" McTavish (Farnum) who runs the trading post.

Lee learns why this is good trapping country as the timber barons across the lake are ruthlessly cutting the trees and driving the animals across the river. The trappers appeal to him to take a petition to the Governor which would prohibit the timber people from coming to their side of the lake. At first, because he is a wanted man, he refuses, but does so later for the sake of the people, even though he knows it will lead to his arrest.

Cast
Robert Lowery as Lee Preston/Leland Bruce
Helen Gilbert as Lynn O'Malley/McTavish
William Farnum as Sandy McTavish
Buster Keaton as Old Tarp/Mr. Boone
Si Jenks as Timber Cross
Stanley Andrews as Howard King
Al Ferguson as Turk Monroe
Trevor Bardette as White Cloud
Estelita Zarco as River Squaw
Ace the Wonder Dog as Ace
Jimmy the Crow as Jim

See also 
God's Country and the Law (1921)
God's Country and the Woman (1937)

References

External links
 
Back to God's Country At BFI
God's Country at TCMDB

1946 films
1946 Western (genre) films
Cinecolor films
American Western (genre) films
Lippert Pictures films
Films directed by Robert Emmett Tansey
Films set in forests
Films about lumberjacks
Remakes of American films
Films based on works by James Oliver Curwood
1940s English-language films
1940s American films